Plastic Ingenuity, headquartered in Cross Plains, WI is a custom thermoformer of plastic and biodegradable packages.

Green practices

Plastic Ingenuity has made various efforts to go green by providing renewable resource packaging as an option to petroleum based products.  Other materials include PLA, PSM, and wood pulp.

The Wisconsin Department of Natural Resources acknowledged PI as a member of their Green Tier Program where qualified businesses make binding commitments to superior environmental performance.  Smart recycling and energy strategies also set a strong example for other businesses to follow by bringing business and environmental goals together.  Located next to Black Earth Creek, a Class I trout stream, PI's Cross Plains facility has implemented rain gardens, a rock weeper dam, runoff filters and grassed swales to remove pollutants from stormwater.  Also implemented was a stringent pellet loss program to prevent spills of the small plastic pellets that serve as raw material, and 99% of scrap plastic is either reused or sold.

Due to the heat generated by compressors and vacuum pumps in the thermoforming process, Plastic Ingenuity has engineered a system to capture the heat from this process and utilize it to heat the warehouse during the winter months, thus reducing natural gas usage and capturing a potentially wasted heat source.

PI Installed 50 200-watt photovoltaic solar panels on the Cross Plains, WI roof top, which produce about 13,262 kilowatt hours of electricity per year.  Producing that amount of energy from non-renewable sources would dump 29,176 pounds of carbon dioxide into the atmosphere.

Locations 
The company has seven locations.
Cross Plains, WI- Corporate Headquarters and Manufacturing Plant
Mazomanie, WI- Manufacturing Plant
Oxford, NC- Manufacturing Plant
Little Rock, AR- Manufacturing Plant
Tooele, UT - Manufacturing Plant
Monterrey, Mexico- Manufacturing Plant
Guadalupe, Mexico Manufacturing Plant

References 

Companies based in Wisconsin